Sphyrotheca is a genus of globular springtails in the family Sminthuridae. There are seven described species in Sphyrotheca.

Species
These seven species belong to the genus Sphyrotheca:
 Sphyrotheca confusa Snider, 1978 i c g
 Sphyrotheca formosana Yosii, 1965 g
 Sphyrotheca minnesotensis (Guthrie, 1903) i c g b
 Sphyrotheca mirabilis (Yosii, 1965) g
 Sphyrotheca mucroserrata Snider, 1978 i c g
 Sphyrotheca multifasciata (Reuter, 1881) i c g
 Sphyrotheca nani Christiansen and Bellinger, 1992 i c g
Data sources: i = ITIS, c = Catalogue of Life, g = GBIF, b = Bugguide.net

References

Further reading

 

Collembola
Articles created by Qbugbot
Springtail genera